Foley Building or Foley House may refer to:

in Canada
Foley House, in Westport, Ontario, Canada, home of Canada's first Prime Minister, Sir John A. Macdonald.

in the United States

Jennie Foley Building, Chicago, Illinois, listed on the National Register of Historic Places (NRHP)
Stephan A. Foley House, Lincoln, Illinois, NRHP-listed
Foley Hall, St. Mary-of-the-Woods, Indiana, NRHP-listed in Vigo County, Indiana
John Foley House, New Hampton, Iowa, NRHP-listed in Iowa
Michael Foley Cottage, Stoneham, Massachusetts, NRHP-listed
Foley-Brower-Bohmer House, St. Cloud, Minnesota, NRHP-listed in Stearns County, Minnesota
James W. Foley House, Bismarck, North Dakota, NRHP-listed
Foley Building (La Grande, Oregon), NRHP-listed in Union County, Oregon
Foley's department store of Houston, Texas
W. L. Foley Building, Houston, Texas, NRHP-listed

See also
Foley (disambiguation)